The 2013 Rose of Tralee was the 54th edition of the annual Irish international festival. The festival ran for a total of 7 days; two additional days were added due to The Gathering Ireland 2013. The festival ran from 14 to 20 August; concluding with the televised event on the final two nights. Many acts performed in Tralee during the festival, including; JLS, Ryan Dolan, The Coronas, Sharon Shannon and The Stunning. Shane Filan made his debut solo performance during the televised selection show on 20 August.

The Texas Rose, Haley O'Sullivan was crowned the winner of the Rose of Tralee for 2013 on 20 August. A memorable highlight from the festival was when the boyfriend of the New Orleans rose proposed to her during the live TV broadcast.

List of Roses

References

External links
Official Site
2013 Rose of Tralee at RTÉ

Rose of Tralee
Rose of Tralee